The Lady of the Photograph is a 1917 American silent comedy drama film directed by Ben Turbett and starring Shirley Mason, Raymond McKee and Gerald Pring. It was made by the Edison Studios shortly before they withdrew from production activities.

Synopsis
An aristocratic but impoverished young Englishman meets an American woman in Britain, but fears he cannot be worthy of her until he has settled his debts. However a self-made American he meets on his ship across the Atlantic offers to help him out financially in exchange for helping him to become a gentleman so that he can woo a woman whose photograph he carries around with him. The Englishman is shocked to discover that it is the same woman he in love with.

Cast
 Shirley Mason as Marjorie Van Dam 
 Raymond McKee as Ferdinand 'Ferdy' Latimer 
 Royal Byron as John Brown 
 Dudley Hill as Eric Latimer 
 William Calhoun as Cornelius Van Dam 
 Gerald Pring as Captain Latimer 
 Jane Harvey as Mrs. Van Dam

References

Bibliography
 Robert B. Connelly. The Silents: Silent Feature Films, 1910-36. December Press, 1998.

External links
 

1917 films
1910s English-language films
American silent feature films
American drama films
American black-and-white films
Films directed by Ben Turbett
Films set in England
1917 drama films
1910s American films
Silent American drama films